Seth Zvi Rosenfeld (born November 16, 1961) is an American playwright, TV writer/producer and filmmaker. Seth credits a youth cemented to a loud corner on Amsterdam Avenue in NYC with setting his imagination afire. A lot of his early work both in plays and film are love-letters to that corner. That would include the Play Servy-N-Bernice 4Ever and the films A Brother's Kiss, King of the Jungle and the NetFlix series The Get Down. It has been said that his work chronicles the collisions of cultures in Urban America.

Personal life
Rosenfeld was born in New York City and was raised in the Bronx and Manhattan. His early interests included graffiti, poetry, and basketball, all of which figure prominently in Rosenfeld's work. 
Formerly, he was married to actress and activist Rosie Perez. He was then married to Kerri-Ann McCalla, a Jamaican-born screenwriter and film producer, until her passing of natural causes in 2018.

Career

Theatre
Rosenfeld began his career as a playwright with the Ensemble Studio Theatre and the now defunct Double Image and Angel Theatre companies. His first project was the play entitled The Writing on the Wall, produced by the Westbeth Theatre Center and for which New Line Cinema purchased the rights. Other plays include The Blackeyed Brothers, which won the Samuel French short play award and was produced by Double Image Theatre; A Brother's Kiss and After the Marching Stopped, produced by Angel Theatre at Intar and retitled Brothers Mothers and Others; Servy-n-Bernice 4ever, directed by Terry Kinney and produced commercially Off-Broadway at the Provincetown Playhouse; A Passover Story, commissioned by the late Joseph Papp for The Public Theater; The Flatted Fifth, Everything is Turning Into Beautiful, and Downtown Race Riot, produced by The New Group. Other works include the tiny plays La Familia, My Starship, and PS: I'm glad you sent your hair for Naked Angels and the Hip-Hop Theatre festival. Many of his plays have been published by Samuel French. His play Handball was workshopped by New York Stage and Film before being produced at Summerstage in New York City.

Film
Rosenfeld transitioned into screenwriting after New Line snapped up the rights to his play, The Writing on the Wall, and then Columbia bought Servy-n-Bernice 4Ever. He's developed scripts and doctored others for most of the major studios. His films have appeared in national and international festivals including Venice and Deauville, and he was invited to participate in the Sundance Institute's Writers and Directors labs. Rosenfeld wrote the feature film, Sunset Park, for Jersey Films/TriStar. His directorial debut, A Brother's Kiss, was based on the Off-Broadway play he wrote and tells a gritty tale of sibling love and loyalty set in East Harlem. Reviews praised the performances and attributed Rosenfeld's upbringing as creating "a realistic sense of street life with hardly a false note." Rosenfeld wrote and directed the films, A Brother's Kiss and King of the Jungle starring John Leguizamo, Marisa Tomei and Rosie Perez, and his award-winning short,Under the Bridge, which ran for several years on BRAVO.  His most recent film is Sunday at Il Posto Accanto, starring Danny Hoch and Victor Rasuk.

Television
Rosenfeld directed ten episodes of an internet series called We Deliver, partnered with Geebee Dajani, which followed the travails of a marijuana delivery service. This project was an early pioneer using the internet as a delivery platform for episodic dramas. Over the past decade Seth has worked extensively in TV. Developing scripts for streamers and premium cable. Cutting his teeth in the writer's room for HBO's "How to Make it in America." He wrote and produced several pilots for HBO, SHOWTIME, FX, CBS, FOX, DISNEY+ and A&E, one of them, "The Get Down" went to series on Netflix directed by Baz Lurhmann. He served as Baz's right hand for 2 seasons. Most recently he served as second in command on the Amazon series "Them", which he has been nominated for a Writers Guild of America award.

References

External links

1961 births
Living people
Writers from New York City
20th-century American dramatists and playwrights
American male screenwriters
American male dramatists and playwrights
20th-century American male writers
Film directors from New York City
Screenwriters from New York (state)